Bromoiodomethane is a halomethane with the formula BrCH2I.  It is a colorless liquid, although older samples appear yellow.  The compound has been investigated as a reagent for cyclopropanation by the Simmons-Smith reaction, but diiodomethane and chloroiodomethane are preferred. It also occurs naturally as the result of microbial action.

Its critical point is at 367.85 °C and 6.3 MPa and refractive index is 1.6382 (20 °C, D).

Additional reading

References

External links
UV Spectra data

Halomethanes
Organobromides
Organoiodides